In mathematics, quaternionic projective space is an extension of the ideas of real projective space and complex projective space, to the case where coordinates lie in the ring of quaternions  Quaternionic projective space of dimension n is usually denoted by

and is a closed manifold of (real) dimension 4n. It is a homogeneous space for a Lie group action, in more than one way. The quaternionic projective line  is homeomorphic to the 4-sphere.

In coordinates
Its direct construction is as a special case of the projective space over a division algebra. The homogeneous coordinates of a point can be written

Two sets of coordinates represent the same point if they are 'proportional' by a left multiplication by a non-zero quaternion c; that is, we identify all the

.

The sphere  then becomes a principal Sp(1)-bundle over :

This bundle is sometimes called a (generalized) Hopf fibration.

Topology

Homotopy theory
The space , defined as the union of all finite 's under inclusion, is the classifying space BS3. However, we do have that

It follows that rationally, i.e. after localisation of a space,  is an Eilenberg–Maclane space . See rational homotopy theory.

This is analogous to complex projective space.

Differential geometry

Quaternionic projective space can be represented as the coset space

where  is the compact symplectic group.

Characteristic classes

Since , its tangent bundle is stably trivial. The tangent bundles of the rest have nontrivial Stiefel–Whitney and Pontryagin classes. The total classes are given by the following formulas:

Special cases

Quaternionic projective line
For example, it was used (implicitly) in 1947 by P. G. Gormley to extend the Möbius group to the quaternion context with linear fractional transformations. For the linear fractional transformations of an associative ring with 1, see projective line over a ring and the homography group GL(2,A).

From the topological point of view the quaternionic projective line is the 4-sphere, and in fact these are diffeomorphic manifolds. The fibration mentioned previously is from the 7-sphere, and is an example of a Hopf fibration.

Explicit expressions for coordinates for the 4-sphere can be found in the article on the Fubini–Study metric.

Quaternionic projective plane
The 8-dimensional  has a circle action, by the group of complex scalars of absolute value 1 acting on the other side (so on the right, as the convention for the action of c above is on the left). Therefore, the quotient manifold

may be taken, writing U(1) for the circle group. It has been shown that this quotient is the 7-sphere, a result of Vladimir Arnold from 1996, later rediscovered by Edward Witten and Michael Atiyah.

References

Further reading
 Treats the analogue of the result mentioned for quaternionic projective space and the 13-sphere.
  

Projective geometry
Homogeneous spaces
Quaternions